Nounsley is a hamlet in the civil parish of Hatfield Peverel, in the Braintree district, in the county of Essex, England. It is connected to the village of Hatfield Peverel by a hill and footpaths. In 2018 it had an estimated population of 681.

There is one public house, The Sportsman's Arms and a ford across the River Ter. Other businesses based in Nounsley include Boon's Calibre Travel, Franklins Fire and Safety. Hatfield Peverel Parish Council manage the small playing field and play area in the hamlet.

The hamlet has only seven roads: Ulting Road, Sportsman Road, Nounsley Road, Manor Road, Priory Farm Road, Priory Close and Peverel Avenue. In the winter of 1962–63, snow on Nounsley Hill cut off the village to wheeled traffic for three days.

The number 73 bus (provided by First) passes through the village travelling from Chelmsford to Maldon stopping at the corner of Ulting Road and Nounsley Road.

References

External links

 Hatfield Peverel Parish Council

Hamlets in Essex
Hatfield Peverel